Keithley Creek is a ghost town located in the Cariboo region of British Columbia.  The town is situated near southwest end of Cariboo Lake, north of Quesnel Lake.

References

Ghost towns in British Columbia